Demolis albitegula is a moth of the family Erebidae first described by Walter Rothschild in 1935. It is found in Brazil.

References

Moths described in 1935
Phaegopterina